Ed Wright (July 21, 1949 – March 20, 2017) was an American fencer. He competed in the team foil event at the 1976 Summer Olympics. He taught fencing in Cincinnati, Ohio.

References

External links
 

1949 births
2017 deaths
American male foil fencers
Olympic fencers of the United States
Fencers at the 1976 Summer Olympics
Sportspeople from Brooklyn